The Honorary Title of "Merited Military Pilot of the Russian Federation" is a state award of the Russian Federation that can trace its history to the Soviet Era.  It was initially established on January 26, 1965 by Decree of the Presidium of the Supreme Soviet № 3230-VI as the honorary title of "Merited Military Pilot of the USSR".  Following the dissolution of the Soviet Union in 1991, the title was retained by the Law of the Russian Federation 2555-1 dated March 20, 1992 and renamed "Merited Military Pilot of the Russian Federation".

Award statute 
The honorary title of "Merited Military Pilot of the Russian Federation" is awarded to members of military flying units, military agencies, military schools, military organizations and other military or federal authorities, having qualified military pilots 1st class or military pilot-instructors 1st class, for outstanding achievements in the development of aviation technology, high performance in education and training of flight personnel and long-term trouble-free flight operations in military aviation.

The President of the Russian Federation is the main conferring authority of the award based on recommendations from the Ministry of Defence of the Russian Federation.

The "Merited Military Pilot of the Russian Federation" chest badge is worn on the right side of the chest and in the presence of other orders, placed over them.

Award description 
The honorary title of "Merited Military Pilot of the Russian Federation" is a 27mm wide by 23mm high silver and nickel polygon with raised edges.  At the top of the obverse, the relief inscription in three lines covered to the left "MERITED MILITARY PILOT", in the center, the gilt tombac image of a jet plane climbing diagonally towards the right its nose and tail slightly protruding over the edges, at the bottom, the relief inscription "RUSSIA" superimposed over a laurel branch.

The insignia is secured to a standard Russian square mount by a silver-plated ring through the suspension loop. The mount is covered by a silk moiré tricolour ribbon of white, blue and red.

Notable recipients

 Major General Timur Avtandilovich Apakidze
 Colonel General Alexander Nikolayevich Zelin
 Colonel Igor Valentinovitch Tkachenko
 Marshal of Aviation Yevgeny Ivanovich Shaposhnikov
 Colonel General Nikolai Timofeyevich Antoshkin

See also

 Merited Military Pilot of the USSR
 Awards and decorations of the Russian Federation
 Russian Air Force
 Honorary titles of Russia

References

External links 
 The Commission on State Awards to the President of the Russian Federation
 The Russian Gazette

Honorary titles of Russia
Orders, decorations, and medals of Russia
Military awards and decorations of Russia
Awards established in 1992